Between 73 and 79 days after the presidential election, the president-elect of the United States is inaugurated as president by taking the presidential oath of office. The inauguration takes place for each new presidential term, even if the president is continuing in office for a second term.

The first inauguration of George Washington took place on April 30, 1789. All subsequent public inaugurations from 1793 until 1933 were held on March 4, except in 1821, 1849, 1877, and 1917, when March 4 fell on a Sunday and the public inauguration ceremony took place on Monday, March 5. Since 1937, it has taken place at noon EST on January 20, the first day of the new term, except in 1957, 1985, and 2013, when January 20 fell on a Sunday. In those years, the presidential oath of office was administered on that day privately and then again in a public ceremony the next day, on Monday, January 21. The most recent presidential inauguration was held on January 20, 2021, when Joe Biden assumed office.

Recitation of the presidential oath of office is the only component in this ceremony mandated by the United States Constitution (in Article II, Section One, Clause 8). Though it is not a constitutional requirement, the chief justice typically administers the presidential oath of office. Since 1789, the oath has been administered at 59 scheduled public inaugurations, by 15 chief justices, one associate justice, and one New York state judge. Others, in addition to the chief justice, have administered the oath of office to several of the nine vice presidents who have succeeded to the presidency upon their predecessor's death or resignation intra-term.

Since the 1981 inauguration of Ronald Reagan, the ceremony has been held at the west front of the United States Capitol facing the National Mall with its iconic Washington Monument and distant Lincoln Memorial. From 1829 through 1977 most swearing-in ceremonies had taken place on a platform over the steps at the Capitol's east portico. They have also been held inside the Old Senate Chamber, the chamber of the House of Representatives, and the Capitol rotunda. The most recent regularly scheduled inauguration not to take place at the Capitol was the fourth inauguration of Franklin D. Roosevelt in 1945, which was held at the White House.

Over the years, various traditions have arisen that have expanded the inauguration from a simple oath-taking ceremony to a day-long event, including parades and multiple social gatherings. The ceremony itself is carried live via the major U.S. commercial television and cable news networks; various ones also stream it live on their websites.

When a president has assumed office intra-term the inauguration ceremony has been conducted without pomp or fanfare. To facilitate a quick presidential transition under extraordinary circumstances, the new president takes the oath of office in a simple ceremony and usually addresses the nation afterward.  This has happened nine times in United States history: eight times after the previous president had died while in office, and once after the previous president had resigned.

Inauguration ceremonies

Dates
The first inauguration, that of George Washington, took place on April 30, 1789. All subsequent (regular) inaugurations from 1793 until 1933, were held on March 4,  the day of the year on which the federal government began operations under the U.S. Constitution in 1789. The exception to this pattern was those years in which March 4 fell on a Sunday. When it did, the public inauguration ceremony would take place on Monday, March 5. This happened on four occasions, in 1821, 1849, 1877, and 1917. Inauguration Day moved to January 20, beginning in 1937, following ratification of the Twentieth Amendment to the Constitution, where it has remained since. A similar Sunday exception and move to Monday is made around this date as well (which happened in 1957, 1985, and 2013).

 
This resulted in several anomalies. It has been alleged that in 1849, Senate President pro tempore David Rice Atchison was president for a day, although all scholars dismiss that claim. In 1877, due to the controversy over the Compromise of 1877, Rutherford B. Hayes was sworn in secretly on March 3 before Ulysses S. Grant's term ended on March 4—raising the question if the United States had two presidents at the same time for one day. In modern times, the president took the oath on a Sunday in a private ceremony and repeated it the following day with all the pomp and circumstance. In 1985 and 2013 these ceremonies were televised. Irregular inaugurations occurred on nine occasions intra-term, after the death or, in one case, resignation of a president.

Inauguration Day, while not a federal holiday, is observed as a holiday by federal employees who would be working in the "Inauguration Day Area" and who are regularly scheduled to perform non-overtime work on Inauguration Day. There is no in-lieu-of holiday for employees or students who are not regularly scheduled to work or attend school on Inauguration Day. The Inauguration Day Area consists of the District of Columbia; Montgomery and Prince George's counties in Maryland; Arlington and Fairfax counties in Virginia (the City of Fairfax is considered part of Fairfax County for this purpose), and the cities of Alexandria and Falls Church in Virginia.

Locations
Most presidential inaugurations since 1801 have been held in Washington D.C. at the Capitol Building. Prior inaugurations were held, first at Federal Hall in New York City (1789), and then at Congress Hall in Philadelphia, Pennsylvania (1793 and 1797). Each city was, at the time, the nation's capital. The location for James Monroe's 1817 swearing in was moved to the Old Brick Capitol in Washington due to on-going restoration work at the Capitol building following the War of 1812.  Three other inaugurations—Franklin D. Roosevelt's fourth (1945), Harry S. Truman's first (1945), and Gerald Ford's (1974)—were held at the White House.

Presidential inaugurations (aside from intra-term ceremonies following the death or resignation of a president) have traditionally been outdoor public ceremonies. In 1909, William H. Taft's inauguration was moved to the Senate Chamber due to a blizzard. Then, in 1985, the public second inauguration of Ronald Reagan was held indoors in the Capitol Rotunda because of harsh weather conditions.

The first inauguration of Andrew Jackson, in 1829, was the first of 35 held on the east front of the Capitol. Since the 1981 first inauguration of Ronald Reagan, they have been held on the Capitol's west front; a move designed to both cut costs and to provide more space for spectators. Above the west front inaugural platform are five large United States flags. The current 50-star flag is displayed in the center. On either side are earlier variations of the national flag: two are the official flag adopted by Congress after the admission to the Union of the new president's home state and two are the 13-star flag popularly known as the Betsy Ross flag.

Organizers

Prior to Inauguration Day, the president-elect will name a Presidential Inaugural Committee. This committee is the legal entity responsible for fundraising for and the planning and coordination of all official events and activities surrounding the inauguration of president and vice president (other than the ceremony), such as the balls and parade.

Since 1901, the Joint Committee on Inaugural Ceremonies has been responsible for the planning and execution of the swearing-in ceremonies. Since 1953, it has also hosted a luncheon at the U.S. Capitol for the new president, vice president, and guests. Three senators and three representatives make up the committee.

The Joint Task Force National Capital Region, composed of service members from all branches of the United States Armed Forces, including Reserve and National Guard components, is responsible for all military support to ceremonies and to civil authorities for the inaugural period (in 2017, January 15–24). U.S. military personnel have participated in Inauguration Day ceremonies since 1789 when members of the Continental Army, local militia units and Revolutionary War veterans escorted George Washington to his first inauguration ceremony. Their participation traditionally includes musical units, color guards, salute batteries and honor cordons. Military support to the inauguration honors the new president, who is commander-in-chief of the armed forces, and recognizes civilian control of the military.

Attendees
In addition to the public, the attendees at the inauguration generally include the vice president, members of Congress, Supreme Court justices, high-ranking military officers, former presidents, living Medal of Honor recipients, and other dignitaries. The outgoing president and vice president also customarily attend the ceremony.

While most outgoing presidents have appeared on the inaugural platform with their successor, six did not:
 John Adams left Washington rather than attend the 1801 inauguration of Thomas Jefferson
 John Quincy Adams also left town, unwilling to be present for the 1829 inauguration of Andrew Jackson
 Martin Van Buren was, for reasons unknown, not present for the 1841 inauguration of William Henry Harrison
 Andrew Johnson conducted a final cabinet meeting rather than attend the 1869 inauguration of Ulysses S. Grant
 Woodrow Wilson, due to poor health, remained inside the Capitol Building during the 1921 inauguration of Warren G. Harding
Donald Trump held a "departure ceremony" and then left Washington, D.C. prior to the 2021 inauguration of Joe Biden

Communication
The way inauguration ceremony events are communicated to the public has changed over the years with each advance in technology. Improvements in mass media technologies have allowed presidents to reach substantially greater numbers of their constituents. In 1829, Andrew Jackson spoke to approximately 10,000 people at his inauguration. Most recently, in 2017, it is estimated that about 160,000 people were in the National Mall areas in the hour leading up to Donald Trump's swearing in. An additional 30.6 million people in the United States watched it on television, and more than 6.8 million worldwide streamed it live on Twitter. Among the inauguration mass communication milestones are:
1801 first inauguration of Thomas Jefferson, first newspaper extra of an inaugural address, printed by the National Intelligencer
1845 inauguration of James K. Polk, first inauguration to be covered by telegraph, and first known newspaper illustration of a presidential inauguration (The Illustrated London News)
1857 inauguration of James Buchanan, first inauguration known to have been photographed
1897 first inauguration of William McKinley, first inauguration to be recorded on film
1905 second inauguration of Theodore Roosevelt, first time that telephones were installed on the Capitol Grounds for an inauguration
1925 second inauguration of Calvin Coolidge, first inauguration to be broadcast nationally by radio
1929 inauguration of Herbert Hoover, first inauguration to be recorded by a talking newsreel
1949 second inauguration of Harry S. Truman, first inauguration to be televised
1961 inauguration of John F. Kennedy, first inauguration to be televised in color
1981 first inauguration of Ronald Reagan, first closed-captioning of television broadcast for the deaf and hard of hearing
1997 second inauguration of Bill Clinton, first time that the ceremony was broadcast live on the Internet

Ceremony elements
Inauguration procedure is governed by tradition rather than the Constitution, the only constitutionally required procedure being the presidential oath of office (which may be taken anywhere, with anyone in attendance who can legally witness an oath, and at any time prior to the actual beginning of the new president's term). Traditionally, the president-elect arrives at the White House and then proceeds to the Capitol Building with the out-going president. Around or after 12 noon, the president takes the oath of office, usually administered by the chief justice of the United States, and then delivers the inaugural address.

Oaths of office

The vice president is sworn into office in the same ceremony as the president. Prior to 1937, the vice presidential oath was administered in the Senate Chamber (in keeping with the vice president's position as president of the Senate). The oath is administered to the vice president first. Immediately afterwards, the United States Marine Band will perform four "ruffles and flourishes", followed by "Hail, Columbia". Unlike the presidential oath, however, the Constitution does not specify specific words that must be spoken. Several variants of the oath have been used since 1789. The current form, which is also recited by senators, representatives, and other government officers, has been in use since 1884:

At noon, the new presidential and vice presidential terms begin. At about that time, the president recites the constitutionally mandated oath of office:

According to Washington Irving's biography of George Washington, after reciting the oath at his (and the nation's) first inauguration, Washington added the words "so help me God". However, the only contemporaneous source that fully reproduced Washington's oath completely lacks the religious codicil. The first newspaper report that actually described the exact words used in an oath of office, Chester Arthur's in 1881, repeated the "query-response" method where the words, "so help me God" were a personal prayer, not a part of the constitutional oath. The time of adoption of the current procedure, where both the chief justice and the president speak the oath, is unknown.

The oath of office was administered to Washington in 1789 by Robert Livingston, Chancellor of New York State. Four years later, the oath was administered by Supreme Court associate justice William Cushing. Since the 1797 inauguration of John Adams, it has become customary for the new president to be sworn into office by the Supreme Court's chief justice. Others have administered the oath on occasions when a new president assumed office intra-term due to the incumbent's death or resignation.  William Cranch, chief judge of the U.S. Circuit Court, administered the oath of office to John Tyler in 1841 when he succeeded to the presidency upon William Henry Harrison's death, and to Millard Fillmore in 1850 when Zachary Taylor died. In 1923, upon being informed of Warren Harding's death, while visiting his family home in Plymouth Notch, Vermont, Calvin Coolidge was sworn in as president by his father, John Calvin Coolidge, Sr., a notary public. Most recently, federal judge Sarah T. Hughes administered the oath of office to Lyndon B. Johnson aboard Air Force One after John F. Kennedy's assassination on November 22, 1963.

Since 1789 there have been 59 inaugural ceremonies to mark the commencement of a new four-year term of a president of the United States, and an additional nine marking the start of a partial presidential term following the intra-term death or resignation of an incumbent president. With the 2021 inauguration of Joe Biden, the oath has been taken 76 different times by 45 people. This numerical discrepancy results chiefly from two factors: a president must take the oath at the beginning of each term of office, and, because the day of inauguration has sometimes fallen on a Sunday, five presidents have taken the oath privately before the public inaugural ceremonies. In addition, three have repeated the oath as a precaution against potential later constitutional challenges.

There is no requirement that any book, or in particular a book of sacred text, be used to administer the oath, and none is mentioned in the Constitution. By convention, incoming presidents raise their right hand and place the left on a Bible or other book while taking the oath of office. While most have, John Quincy Adams did not use a Bible when taking the oath in 1825; neither did Theodore Roosevelt in 1901.  In 1853, Franklin Pierce affirmed the oath of office rather than swear it. More recently, a Catholic missal was used for Lyndon B. Johnson's 1963 swearing in ceremony.

Bibles of historical significance have sometimes been used at inaugurations. George H. W. Bush, Jimmy Carter and Dwight D. Eisenhower used the George Washington Inaugural Bible. Barack Obama placed his hand upon the Lincoln Bible for his oaths in 2009 and 2013, as did Donald Trump in 2017. Joe Biden placed his hand upon a large leather-bound family Bible.

Immediately after the presidential oath, the United States Marine Band will perform four "ruffles and flourishes", followed by "Hail to the Chief", while simultaneously, a 21-gun salute is fired using artillery pieces from the Presidential Guns Salute Battery, 3rd United States Infantry Regiment "The Old Guard" located in Taft Park, north of the Capitol. The actual gun salute begins with the first "ruffle and flourish", and "run long" (i.e. the salute concludes after "Hail to the Chief" has ended). The Marine Band, which is believed to have made its inaugural debut in 1801 for Thomas Jefferson's first inauguration, is the only musical unit to participate in all three components of the presidential inauguration: the swearing-in ceremony, the inaugural parade, and an inaugural ball. During the ceremony, the band is positioned directly below the presidential podium at the U.S. Capitol.

Inaugural address

Newly sworn-in presidents usually give a speech referred to as an inaugural address. As with many inaugural customs, this one was started by George Washington in 1789. After taking his oath of office on the balcony of Federal Hall, he proceeded to the Senate chamber where he read a speech before members of Congress and other dignitaries. Every president since Washington has delivered an inaugural address. While many of the early presidents read their addresses before taking the oath, current custom dictates that the chief justice administer the oath first, followed by the president's speech. William McKinley requested the change in 1897, so that he could reiterate the words of the oath at the close of his first inaugural address.

William Henry Harrison delivered the longest inaugural address, at 8,445 words, in 1841. John Adams' 1797 address, which totaled 2,308 words, contained the longest sentence, at 737 words. In 1793, Washington gave the shortest inaugural address on record, just 135 words.

Most presidents use their inaugural address to present their vision of America and to set forth their goals for the nation. Some of the most eloquent and powerful speeches are still quoted today. In 1865, in the waning days of the Civil War, Abraham Lincoln stated, "With malice toward none, with charity for all, with firmness in the right as God gives us to see the right, let us strive on to finish the work we are in, to bind up the nation's wounds, to care for him who shall have borne the battle and for his widow and his orphan, to do all which may achieve and cherish a just and lasting peace among ourselves and with all nations." In 1933, Franklin D. Roosevelt avowed, "the only thing we have to fear is fear itself.” And in 1961, John F. Kennedy declared, "And so my fellow Americans: ask not what your country can do for you – ask what you can do for your country."

On the eight occasions where the new president succeeded to the office upon their predecessor's death intra-term, none gave an address, but each did address Congress soon thereafter. When Gerald Ford became president in 1974, following the resignation of Richard Nixon, he addressed the nation after taking the oath, but he characterized his speech as "Not an inaugural address, not a fireside chat, not a campaign speechjust a little straight talk among friends".

Prayers

Since 1937, the ceremony has incorporated one or more prayers.  Since 1933 an associated prayer service either public or private attended by the president-elect has often taken place on the morning of the day.  At times a major public or broadcast prayer service takes place after the main ceremony most recently on the next day.

Poems

Six inaugural ceremonies since 1961 have included a reading by a poet. The following poetry readings have taken place: 
Inauguration of John F. Kennedy (1961): Robert Frost read part of "Dedication" and recited "The Gift Outright"
First inauguration of Bill Clinton (1993): Maya Angelou read her poem "On the Pulse of Morning"
Second inauguration of Bill Clinton (1997): Miller Williams read his poem "Of History and Hope" 
First inauguration of Barack Obama (2009): Elizabeth Alexander read her poem "Praise Song for the Day"
Second inauguration of Barack Obama (2013): Richard Blanco read his poem "One Today"
 Inauguration of Joe Biden (2021): Amanda Gorman read her poem "The Hill We Climb"

Other elements
Over the years, various inauguration traditions have arisen that have expanded the event from a simple oath-taking ceremony to a day-long one, including parades, speeches, and balls. In fact, contemporary inaugural celebrations typically span 10 days, from five days before the inauguration to five days after. On some occasions however, either due to the preferences of the new president or to other constraining circumstances, they have been scaled back. Such was the case in 1945, because of rationing in effect during World War II. More recently, in 1973, the celebrations marking Richard Nixon's second inauguration were altered because of the death of former president Lyndon B. Johnson two days after the ceremony. All pending events were cancelled so preparations for Johnson's state funeral could begin. Because of the construction work on the center steps of the East Front, Johnson's casket was taken up the Senate wing steps of the Capitol when taken into the rotunda to lie in state. When it was brought out, it came out through the House wing steps of the Capitol. In 2021, due to the COVID-19 pandemic, the festivities were scaled back.

Congressional luncheon

Since 1953, the president and vice president have been guests of honor at a luncheon held by the leadership of the United States Congress immediately following the inaugural ceremony. The luncheon is held in Statuary Hall and is organized by the Joint Congressional Committee on Inaugural Ceremonies, and attended by the leadership of both houses of Congress as well as guests of the president and vice president. By tradition, the outgoing president and vice president will not attend. In 2021, due to the ongoing COVID-19 pandemic, the luncheon was replaced by a gift-giving ceremony.

Inaugural parade

Following the arrival of the presidential entourage to the White House, it is customary for the president, vice-president, their respective families and leading members of the government and military to review an inaugural parade from an enclosed stand at the edge of the North Lawn, a custom begun by James Garfield in 1881. The parade, which proceeds along  of Pennsylvania Avenue in front of the stand and the Front Lawn in view of the presidential party, features both military and civilian participants from all 50 states and the District of Columbia; this parade largely evolved from the post-inaugural procession to the White House, and occurred as far back as Jefferson's second inauguration in 1805, when workers from the Washington Navy Yard, accompanied by military music, marched with the president on foot as he rode on horseback from the Capitol to the White House. By the time of William Henry Harrison's inauguration in 1841, political clubs and marching societies would regularly travel to Washington for the parade. That year was also the first in which floats were part of the parade. It was at Lincoln's second inauguration, in 1865, that Native Americans and African Americans participated in the inaugural parade for the first time. Women were involved for the first time in 1917.

In 1829, following his first inaugural parade, Andrew Jackson held a public reception at the White House, during which 20,000 people created such a crush that Jackson had to escape through a window. Nevertheless, White House receptions continued until lengthy afternoon parades created scheduling problems. Reviving the idea in 1989, President George H. W. Bush invited the public to a "White House American Welcome" on the day after the inaugural.

Grover Cleveland’s 1885 inaugural parade lasted three hours and showcased 25,000 marchers. Eighty years later, Lyndon Johnson’s parade included 52 select bands. Dwight D. Eisenhower's 1953 parade included about 22,000 service men and women and 5,000 civilians, which included 50 state and organization floats costing $100,000. There were also 65 musical units, 350 horses, 3 elephants, an Alaskan dog team, and the 280-millimeter atomic cannon.

In 1977, Jimmy Carter became the first president to set out by foot for more than a mile on the route to the White House. The walk has become a tradition that has been matched in ceremony if not in length by the presidents who followed.

Twice during the 20th century, an inaugural parade down Pennsylvania Avenue was not held. In 1945, at the height of World War II, Franklin D. Roosevelt's fourth Inauguration was simple and austere with no fanfare or formal celebration following the event. There was no parade because of gas rationing and a lumber shortage. In 1985, with the temperature near , all outdoor events for Ronald Reagan's second inauguration were canceled or moved indoors.

Interfaith national prayer service

A tradition of an interfaith national prayer service, usually the day after the inauguration, dates back to George Washington and since Franklin Delano Roosevelt, the prayer service has been held at the Washington National Cathedral. This is not the same as the Inaugural Prayer, a tradition also begun by Washington, when on June 1, 1789, Methodist bishops Francis Asbury and Thomas Coke, Rev. John Dickins, the pastor of Old St. George's (America's oldest Methodist Church) and Major Thomas Morrell, one of President Washington's former aides-de-camp called upon Washington in New York City. This tradition resumed in 1985 with President Reagan and continues under the auspices of a Presidential Inaugural Prayer Committee based at Old St. George's.

Inaugural balls

The first Inaugural Ball was held on the night of James Madison's first inauguration in 1809. Tickets were $4 and it took place at Long's Hotel.

Security

The security for the inaugural celebrations is a complex matter, involving the Secret Service, Department of Homeland Security, Federal Protective Service (DHS-FPS), all five branches of the Armed Forces, the Capitol Police, the United States Park Police (USPP), and the Metropolitan Police Department of the District of Columbia (MPDC). Federal law enforcement agencies also sometimes request assistance from various other state and local law-enforcement agencies throughout the United States.

Presidential medals

Beginning with George Washington, there has been a traditional association with Inauguration festivities and the production of a presidential medal. With the District of Columbia attracting thousands of attendees for inauguration, presidential medals were an inexpensive souvenir for the tourists to remember the occasion. However, the once-simple trinket turned into an official presidential election memento. In 1901, the first Inauguration Committee on Medals and Badges was established as part of the official Inauguration Committee for the re-election of President McKinley. The Committee saw official medals as a way to raise funding for the festivities. Gold medals were to be produced as gifts for the president, vice president, and committee chair; silver medals were to be created and distributed among Inauguration Committee members, and bronze medals would be for sale for public consumption. McKinley's medal was simple with his portrait on one side and writing on the other side.

Unlike his predecessor, when Theodore Roosevelt took his oath of office in 1905, he found the previous presidential medal unacceptable. As an art lover and admirer of the ancient Greek high-relief coins, Roosevelt wanted more than a simple medal—he wanted a work of art. To achieve this goal, the president hired Augustus Saint-Gaudens, a famous American sculptor, to design and create his inauguration medal. Saint-Gaudens' obsession with perfection resulted in a forestalled release and the medals were distributed after the actual inauguration. Nonetheless, President Roosevelt was very pleased with the result. Saint-Gaudens' design, executed by Adolph A. Weinman, was cast by Tiffany & Company and was proclaimed an artistic triumph. Saint-Gaudens' practice of creating a portrait sculpture of the newly elected president is still used today in presidential medal creation. After the president sits for the sculptor, the resulting clay sketch is turned into a life mask and plaster model. Finishing touches are added and the epoxy cast that is created is used to produce the die cuts. The die cuts are then used to strike the president's portrait on each medal.

From 1929 through 1949, the official medal was struck by the U.S. Mint. This changed in 1953 when the Medallic Art Company was chosen to strike Walker Hancock's portrait of President Eisenhower. The official medals have been struck by private mints ever since. The Smithsonian Institution and The George Washington University hold the two most complete collections of presidential medals in the United States.

Gerald Ford's unscheduled inauguration also had a medal.

List of inauguration ceremonies

The 59 inauguration ceremonies marking the start of a new four-year presidential term of office and also the nine marking the start of a partial presidential term following the intra-term death or resignation of an incumbent president are listed in the table below.

Notes

Graphical timeline of U.S. presidents

See also
 United States presidential transition

References

Further reading

External links

Inauguration Ceremonies, U.S. Senate
U.S. Presidential Inaugurations: "I Do Solemnly Swear..." A Resource Guide from the Library of Congress
Full texts of all U.S. Inaugural Addresses at Bartleby.com
Historical Inauguration Speeches at YouTube from C-SPAN, 12 videos, spanning 1933 through 2013
Corpus of Political Speeches Free access to political speeches by American and other politicians, developed by Hong Kong Baptist University Library

 
presidential inauguration
presidential inauguration
January events
presidential inauguration
Articles containing video clips